David Doman is an electrical engineer with the USAF Air Force Research Laboratory in Rome, New York. He was named a Fellow of the Institute of Electrical and Electronics Engineers (IEEE) in 2016 for his contributions to flight dynamics and control.

References

Fellow Members of the IEEE
Living people
Year of birth missing (living people)
Place of birth missing (living people)
American electrical engineers